Uncompahgre can refer to several different geographic features, mainly within Colorado:

Places
 Uncompahgre Peak
 Uncompahgre Plateau
 Uncompahgre National Forest
 Uncompahgre River
 Uncompahgre Gorge
 Uncompahgre Wilderness

Other
 Uncompahgre Ute people